Holden Street Theatres (HST) is a South Australian performing arts theatre complex in Hindmarsh, an inner-western suburb of Adelaide. It is housed in the heritage-listed All Saints' Anglican Church (also known as All Saints' Church) complex. The complex includes three performance spaces: The Studio, The Arch and The Bar.

Holden Street Theatres hosts performances at the Adelaide Fringe, the Feast Festival, and the Guitars in Bars festival, as well as year-round productions by local, national and international artists. It is home to resident theatre companies Holden Street Theatre Company and  Red Phoenix Theatre.

The headquarters are at Thebarton Theatre, with which HST is in partnership.

Location and description
The complex is located at 34 Holden Street, Hindmarsh, next to Coopers Stadium.

There are three performance spaces within the complex: The Studio (up to 150 seats), The Arch (125 seats, named for its proscenium arch ceiling), and The Bar (capacity 60–100 people). An extra performance space and two galleries are provided during the Adelaide Fringe. The head office is at the Thebarton Theatre,  which is in partnership with Holden Street Theatres.

History 
Holden Street Theatres is situated in what was originally the All Saints' Anglican Church. Built in the Norman style the limestone and brick church was designed by Henry Stuckey. Bishop Augustus Short laid the foundation stone in 1849, and the church that was opened on 23 June 1850. During this time a rectory was also built near by to house the clergy for the church. In 1955 a gallery was built with a chancel and vestry being added in 1872. Due to lack of funds the church had to rely on donations from the community to add the chancel and vestry, with local Thebarton resident, John Taylor, donating a majority of the £272 needed. Several years later the All Saints Church Hall was built nearby. Designed in a similar style to the church, it was opened on 28 March 1883.

The buildings were listed on the former Register of the National Estate on 28 September 1982 and on the  South Australian Heritage Register on 23 November 1989. During the later part of the 20th century the church, hall and rectory became disused until it was taken on by the City of Charles Sturt and became a space for lease. In 2002 the church and hall were leased by Weslo Holdings under guidance of artistic director Martha Lott to be used as a theatre venue, while the Nature Foundation SA took over the rectory as its head offices.

The original church was renovated in 2004 to become The Arch.

In December 2020 the Nature Foundation of South Australia moved out of the rectory and it was incorporated into Holden Street Theatres to create the Holden Street Theatres' Arts Park. It offers several more rooms and a garden to be used as rehearsal or performance spaces.

Associated companies and events 
Holden Street Theatres is the home of Red Phoenix Theatre Company, a local South Australian community theatre company that is dedicated to producing only plays which have not been performed in Adelaide before.

Holden Street Theatre Company is also resident at the complex.

The venue also hosts many events as part of the Adelaide Fringe, the annual open-access arts festival; Feast Festival, an annual festival celebrating the LGBT community; and the Guitars in Bars festival, an annual festival aimed at getting more local music into small venues.

Holden Street Theatres Awards 
Holden Street Theatres also gives out two annual awards, one at the Adelaide Fringe and one at the Edinburgh Festival Fringe.

The Holden Street Theatres' Edinburgh Fringe Award gives support to the winning company to tour its show at the following Adelaide Fringe. The award is open to theatre shows performed at the Edinburgh Festival Fringe who have not previously performed the show in Australia.

Holden Street Theatres' Edinburgh Fringe Award winners:

 2008: Dogstar Theatre - The Tailor of Inverness
 2009: King Brilliant Theatre and Richard Jordan Productions - Heroin(e) for Breakfast
 2010: Beartrap Theatre - Bound
 2011: Les Enfants Terribles Theatre Co. - The Terrible Infants
 2012: Second Shot Productions - Glory Dazed
 2013: Snuff Box Theatre and Richard Jordan Productions - Bitch Boxer
 2014: Lip Sink & Francesca Clark Productions - Mush & Me
 2014: Penn State Center Stage - Blood at the Root
 2015: Joe Sellman-Leava - Lables
 2015: Gary McNair - A Gambler's Guide to Dying
 2016: Prime Cut Productions - Scorch
 2016: Red Beard Productions and Gilded Balloon - Angel by Henry Naylor
 2017: Unpolished Theatre and Pleasance Theatre Trust - Flesh & Bone
 2018: Molly Taylor - Extinguished Things
 2018: Stephen Joseph Theatre and Tara Finney Productions - Build a Rocket
2019: Sh!t Theater - Sh!t Theatre Drink Rum with Expats

The Holden Street Theatres' Adelaide Fringe Award is awarded to a local producer during the Adelaide Fringe and gives support in the form of venue and rehearsal spaces for a new production from the company.

Holden Street Theatres' Adelaide Fringe Award winners:

 2016: Gobsmacked Theatre - Dropped
 2017: Joanne Hartstone - The Girl Who Jumped Off the Hollywood Sign
 2018: CCtheatreCo. - Abandon Ship
 2019: Under the Microscope Productions - 30,000 Notes
2020: starheART Theatre - Dirty People
2020: Millicent Sarre - Friendly Feminism for the Mild Mannered
2021: Taylor Nobes - Does It Please You?

References

External links

Theatres in Adelaide
South Australian Heritage Register
Culture of South Australia
South Australian places listed on the defunct Register of the National Estate